Oskar Pietsch (1918–2012) was a German art director.

Selected filmography

 Kein Hüsung (1954)
 Der Ochse von Kulm (1955)
 The Captain from Cologne (1956)
 Berlin, Schoenhauser Corner (1957)
 My Wife Makes Music (1958)
 Love's Confusion (1959)
 Auf Wiedersehen (film) (1961)
 The Invisible Dr. Mabuse (1962)

References

Bibliography
 Kalat, David. The Strange Case of Dr. Mabuse: A Study of the Twelve Films and Five Novels. McFarland, 2005.

External links

1918 births
2012 deaths
German art directors
Film people from Berlin